Kristián Lukáčik (born 29 March 1998) is a Slovak football midfielder.

Club career

ŠKF iClinic Sereď
Lukáčik made his Fortuna Liga debut for iClinic Sereď against Slovan Bratislava on 16 March 2019.

References

External links
 
 
 Futbalnet profile 

1998 births
Living people
Sportspeople from Košice
Slovak footballers
Slovak expatriate footballers
Association football midfielders
FK Železiarne Podbrezová players
Atlético Saguntino players
ŠKM Liptovský Hrádok players
ŠKF Sereď players
FK Senica players
FK Dukla Banská Bystrica players
3. Liga (Slovakia) players
2. Liga (Slovakia) players
Slovak Super Liga players
Slovak expatriate sportspeople in Spain
Expatriate footballers in Spain